Erreway en Concierto (Erreway in Concert) is the first compilation album by Argentine band Erreway. It was released in 2006 in Spain and had very large success there. Artists on this album were Benjamin Rojas, Felipe Colombo, Camila Bordonaba and Luisana Lopilato, but there were also some actors and actresses from Rebelde Way, like Victoria Maurette and Piru Saez.

This album was produced, created and directed by Cris Morena. Music and lyrics were by Cris Morena, Silvio Furmansky, Gustavo Novello and Carlos Nilson. The compilation included tracks from Erreway's albums Señales (2002) and Tiempo (2003) and DVD.

Track listing

Album
Album included songs from albums Señales and Tiempo.
"Rebelde Way"
"Bonita de Más"
"Te Soñé"
"Perder Un Amigo"
"Te Dejé"
"Vave La Pena"
"Sweet Baby"
"Aún, Ahora"
"Pretty Boy"
"Inmortal"
"Mi Vida"
"Tiempo"
"No Soy Así"
"Será Porque Te Quiero"
"Sweet Baby"
"Rebelde Way"
"Resistiré"

DVD
DVD included videos from Erreway's live shows.
"Rebelde Way"
"Bonita de Más"
"Te Soñé"
"Perder Un Amigo"
"Te Dejé"
"Vave La Pena"
"Sweet Baby"
"Aún, Ahora"
"Pretty Boy"
"Inmortal"
"Mi Vida"
"Tiempo"
"No Soy Así"
"We Will Rock You"
"Será Porque Te Quiero"
"Sweet Baby"
"Resistiré"

Erreway albums
2007 compilation albums
2007 live albums
2007 video albums
Live video albums